An industrial accident occurred at a Con Edison substation Astoria, Queens, New York City, on December 27, 2018. During the incident, a 138,000 volt coupling capacitor potential device failed which resulted in an arc flash which in turn burned aluminum, lighting up the sky with blue-green spectacle visible for miles around and as far as New Jersey. The event was covered extensively on social media and LaGuardia Airport temporarily lost power, but there were neither deaths nor injuries. Such was the magnitude of the bizarre illumination that extraterrestrial visitation was a common supposition.

See also

References

Astoria, Queens
Energy accidents and incidents in the United States